The 2009 Andaman Islands earthquake occurred on August 11 at  in the Andaman Islands of India. The earthquake magnitude was recorded as 7.5 Mw, and was the strongest in the region since the 2004 Indian Ocean earthquake and tsunami.  The epicentre was 260 km north of Port Blair, and tremors were felt in south-east India, Bangladesh, Myanmar, and Thailand. The Pacific Tsunami Warning Center issued a tsunami watch to India, Myanmar, Bangladesh, Indonesia and Thailand, but it was later lifted. No casualties or injuries were reported, although there were complaints about minor damage to buildings. Twelve minutes after the earthquake, the  2009 Shizuoka earthquake affected south Honshū in Japan.

See also 
List of earthquakes in 2009
List of earthquakes in India

References

External links 

2009 earthquakes
Earthquakes in India
2009 disasters in India
History of the Andaman and Nicobar Islands
August 2009 events in India
Earthquakes in Myanmar